Wuhai (Üqai qota, Mongolian cyrillic.Үхай хот) is a prefecture-level city  and regional center in the Inner Mongolia Autonomous Region, China, and is by area the smallest prefecture-level division of the region. It is located on the Yellow River between the Gobi and Ordos deserts. Wuhai became a single city occupying both banks of the Yellow River with the amalgamation on 1976 of left-bank (west) Wuda (then administrated by Bayan Nuur League) together with Haibowan on the right (east) bank (then administrated by Ikh Juu league).  Wuhai is one of very few cities with an antipode which is not only on land (as opposed to open ocean), but which is another inhabited city; the antipode of Wuhai is almost exactly on the city of Valdivia, Chile. Football commentator and Television host Huang Jianxiang is born here.

History 
The modern location of Wuhai was originally composed of two towns: Wuda which lied on the western side of the Yellow River and Haibowan which was located in the eastern side of the river. Wuda became a coal mining town around 1864 when it was settled by Chinese laborers. Slightly later, Haibowan was settled by Chinese farmers around 1900. Wuda and Haibowan were merged as Wuhai in 1976.

Demographics 

Administrative subdivisions 
Wuhai city is divided into three districts:

Climate
Wuhai experiences a cool arid climate (Köppen: BWk), characterized by freezing, dry winters and hot summers. Spring is dry, with occasional dust storms, followed by early summer heat waves. Summer tends to be hot with the greatest precipitation occurring in July and August. Because of the aridity, there tends to be considerable diurnal variation in temperature, except during the summer. Approximately 45 percent of the average annual precipitation falls in July and August.

Economy 

The city's economy is heavily based on coal mining, electric power generation, metal-working and chemical industries, but also on fruit (grapes, winemaking) and dairy farming. Wuhai is a stop on the Baotou-Lanzhou rail line, and an airport was opened in 2003.

Rock art in six places at the foot of the Zhuozi Shan (Mount Zhuozhi) has been dated back to the Xia, Shang, and Zhou Dynasties, the Warring States period, and the Han Dynasty.

Transportation 

Wuhai is served by Wuhai Airport with flights to Beijing, Shanghai, Guangzhou and other cities.

Wuhai lies on a major Yellow River train route, connecting a large number of cities in Inner Mongolia, central and southern China. Travel time from Beijing by train is approximately 20 hours and prices range from 350 yuan (US$50) for 2nd class "hard sleeper" ticket to 480 yuan (US$75) for the 1st class "soft sleeper" ticket. Tickets from neighboring Baotou cost approx 53 yuan (US$8.6 as of 2014/09/15) for a 4-hour train journey.

Transportation within the city is very simple and affordable. Almost every other car is a taxi. Meter starts from 5 yuan (US$0.8) for the first 2 miles and 1.2 yuan (US$0.19) for every mile thereafter. Buses are very frequent and cost 1 yuan per person.

Beijing PanAm International Aviation Academy (BPIAA) 

Although Wuhai in general is lacking large higher educational institutions, in the early 2007 a major foreign investment was injected into the development of a local flight training base for Chinese airline cadets located in Wuhai Regional Airport (ICAO abbrev. "ZBUH"). The flight base has 8 to 14 Diamond DA40 light training aircraft providing flight lessons for over 130 students designated to train at this base. Convenient airport location close to the city, low levels of pollution and relatively fair weather/visibility factors allow flight training approximately 300 days per year (subject to military restrictions). The arrival of Beijing Panam International Aviation Academy also laid a foundation for the first ever foreign community in Wuhai, composed mostly of foreign Flight Instructors from various ICAO countries working on annual contracts for BPIAA.

At the end of 2008, following the World economic recession, the company, previously belonging to an American AIG Insurance Corporation, fell into financial difficulties and stopped operating awaiting injection of the new investment funds either from the Chinese government or independent investors.

Dining, Entertainment and Night Life 
Wuhai's dining scene consists of numerous small bars and restaurants, catering for a range of Chinese, Mongolian and western cuisines. Popular dining choices are:

Hot pot serving a type of Chinese meat and vegetable fondue in a traditional "uni-pot" way or a modern "personal pot" styles. Pots are filled with either creamy or spicy soups and set on fire which is built into the table. Thinly-sliced meat, vegetables and flat noodles are served uncooked. It is up to the customer to add the ingredients to the hot-pot sitting on the table where it's cooked in seconds. A traditional and very popular activity, bringing families and friends together every weekend.

Mongolian BBQ serving a variety of meats (mostly beef, lamb, and chicken) roasted on open fire and seasoned with local spices. Popular BBQ dining areas could be found on both southern and northern sides of central square.

Western restaurants, serving a variety of foods catering for the European and American tastes are also available. Fast food places serving westerns-style foods are located right in the middle of town near Wuhai hotel on an intersection of two central roads.

Traditional Chinese Han restaurants are widely available. Serving a great variety of noodles and rather oily meat dishes.

Mongolian Mn-Mye dishes, served in a large traditional wok for the whole table to share. Hundreds of ingredient combinations could be ordered by a customer by ticking boxes on a menu order form while visiting these specialist restaurants. Once ordered, the Mn-Mye chef combines the requested ingredients in a wok, adds fresh chilly peppers, ginger, garlic, coriander and other indigenous spices. The dish is ready in minutes.

There is a Mongolian style theme park built in the north-western part of the city. It offers authentic Mongolian-style dining in a traditional Yurt restaurant, camel rides and other activities. Desert Fun park is also located further north, offering dune cart rides, quad biking, dune jeep riding, etc.

A fair number and variety of local bars and clubs are located around the city, among them "100% Night Club", "Huang Kang" (daily life rock music by band "Fu Sha"), "V8 Bar" (popular dance music), and "Music Kitchen" (mix of professional and amateur life music performances).

A Colombian coffee house, called "The Plow Coffee" serving a selection of domestic and foreign coffees is located one block to the South-East of the central "People's Square" serves as a trendy and modern hang-out for foreigners and locals.

A large number of KTV (Karaoke) style bars are widely available around the city and enjoy a great popularity among locals.

Recreation and Sports 

A number of very modern gyms with an average membership fee between $40 to US$60 per months are available for use in the city center and other convenient locations. Shi Ji Yuan Hotel offers good 25m swimming pool facilities (attendance fee around $2. No lifeguard). A modern round mini-stadium building, located in the middle of town, offers new tennis and basketball playgrounds as well as some ThaiJi and KungFu classes.

Mountain climbing is extremely popular activity among the locals and foreigners alike. There is a long mountain ridge located to the south-east of the city, a short walk away from its SE corner. Mountain peaks range from 400m AGL to 700m AGL and take approximately 1 to 2 hours to conquer, depending on your physical abilities. Beginner level climbers are likely to enjoy this hike. For the more advanced mountaineers, the highest peak to the south of the city is standing almost 1000m AGL tall and may be a little more challenging to climb. City charges no fees for mountain-climbing activities and welcomes anyone to try.

A full-size western-style bowling alley is located in the NW part of the city, near a central street roundabout. Alley features a full bar, computerized score-keeping system and costs 12 yuan per game in the evening and 3 yuan in the morning, before 12:00.

Housing Project Scandal 
Wuhai has been the center of public outrage when it was revealed that money originally assigned to build low income housing project was used to build extravagant office buildings instead .

According to the 2006 official statistics by the local government, 45,344 households totaling 146,306 people, or over 30% of total population in the urban area, lived in shacks in the slums.  These low income families had to deal with problems including the lacks of drainage, clean water supply and poor hygiene conditions. As a result, a housing project was planned to rebuild the area, starting in February, 2006.  The plan called for 15% completion by the end of 2007, 40% completion respectively in 2008, and 2009, and the remaining by the end of 2010.  In reality, however, the plan failed to materialize because not a single penny was provided.  Subsequent investigation by auditing authorities and media investigation revealed that the CYN 150 million funds that were supposed used as the initial funding was used to build luxury office buildings instead.

The new governmental office building, dubbed as the "Wuhai Urban Administrative Center Building", was located in the Binhe New District.  The building totaled 17 stories above the ground, with an addition one below the ground.  In addition, there was also another 5-story building connected to this main building.  The total area is around 61,168 square meters, with construction begun in March, 2006, and the building complex is expected to be fully operational before the end of 2008.  The contractor admitted that the office building complex is as luxurious as a four-star hotel.  Audits and investigation revealed that the building complex cost CYN 150 million, and the initial fund for the housing project to rebuild the slums populated by the low income families was used, causing the housing project to be stalled in idle.

When the scandal was exposed by numerous Chinese media such as Economic Reference, it greatly angered the public.  Further public outrage resulted in the fact that the current office building was already too extravagant: it occupies an area totaled 100,000 square meters, with over 20,000 square meters office space, and additionally, the current office building was just completed in October, 2001.  Auditing and investigation also revealed that many cadres opposed the construction of the luxury office building complex and pointed out that according to the law, such project must be evaluated and approved by higher authorities, which it was highly unlikely because it would be nothing more than a waste for a show-piece project, and there was no money to fund such projects.

However, the opposition was brushed aside and those cadres who voice their concern were scolded by the local party bosses, who harshly criticized those opposed as "lacking the open mind, not following the great rapid development of Wuhai".  As a result, the local government bypassed the law by deciding to carry out the construction anyway, and the CYN 150 million funds that were supposed used as the initial funding in the housing project was used to build luxury office building complex instead. Not surprisingly, when media requested interviews with local high-ranking officials regarding the matter, none came forward.

References

External links 

 Government Official Web Site
 Wuhai Daily 
 nmgnews.com 
 Chinadaily
 Mongolian map of Üqai

Cities in Inner Mongolia
Prefecture-level divisions of Inner Mongolia